Bruno Todeschini (born 19 September 1962) is a Franco-Swiss actor.

Life and career
Todeschini studied at L'école supérieure d'art dramatique in Genève and after graduating in 1986, he joined the Théâtre Nanterre-Amandiers, directed by Patrice Chéreau.

He has since then been appearing on television (Les Rois maudits, 2005) and in films, many directed by Chéreau.

Personal life
Todeschini has a child from a previous relationship, a son named Romain, born in 1997. He is married to actress Sophie Broustal, with whom he has a daughter, Paloma, born on 6 June 2006.

He is fluent in French and Italian.

Selected filmography
 1987 - Hôtel de France 
 1992 - La sentinelle
 1994 - Coming to Terms with the Dead
 1995 - El pasajero clandestino
 1997 - Comanche Territory
 1998 - Ceux qui m'aiment prendront le train
 2000 - Le Libertin
 2002 - A Private Affair
 2003 - Son frère
 2004 - Olgas Sommer
 2004 - Secret Agents
 2004 - The Last Day
 2005 - Un amour à taire (TV)
 2005 - Les Rois maudits (TV)
 2005 - La Petite Jérusalem
 2005 - Good Girl
 2006 - 7 Ans
 2007 - Fallen Heroes
 2009 - Lourdes
 2011 - La délicatesse
 2013 - Mary Queen of Scots
 2014 - La French
 2015 - Papa lumière
 2016 - Capitaine Marleau (1 Episode)
 2017 : Jalouse

External links

1962 births
Living people
People from Neuchâtel
Swiss male stage actors
Swiss male television actors
Swiss male film actors
French male stage actors
French male television actors
French male film actors
French expatriates in Switzerland
20th-century Swiss male actors
21st-century French male actors
21st-century Swiss male actors
20th-century French male actors
Best Actor Lumières Award winners